The 2023 Periodic Review of Westminster constituencies is the current cycle of the process to redraw the constituency map for the House of Commons. The process for periodic reviews of parliamentary constituencies in the United Kingdom is governed by the Parliamentary Constituencies Act 1986, as amended by the Parliamentary Voting System and Constituencies Act 2011 and subsequently by the Parliamentary Constituencies Act 2020. This review is the successor to the 2018 Periodic Review of Westminster constituencies, which was ultimately abandoned after it failed to pass into law.

Under current legislation, the four Boundary Commissions of the United Kingdom are required to report on their next review of the boundaries of parliamentary constituencies before 1 July 2023. In order to meet this deadline, the Commissions began their work on 5 January 2021.

Previous reviews
The 2013 Periodic Review of Westminster constituencies was launched by the Parliamentary Voting System and Constituencies Act 2011. The process began in 2011 and was intended to be completed by 2013, but a January 2013 vote in the House of Commons temporarily stopped the process. The 2018 Periodic Review of Westminster constituencies commenced following the 2015 general election and the four Boundary Commissions submitted their final recommendations to the Secretary of State on 5 September 2018 and made their reports public a week later. Leader of the House of Commons Andrea Leadsom told the House on 13 September 2018 that "it will be some time" before the necessary statutory instruments would be put forward for approval by both the Commons and the Lords. The proposals were never put forward for approval before the calling of the general election held on 12 December 2019, and in December 2020 the reviews were formally abandoned under the Schedule to the Parliamentary Constituencies Act 2020.

Proposed changes 
The Government's policy position regarding the process for the 2023 review was confirmed in a written statement, entitled Strengthening Democracy, by Minister of State for the Cabinet Office Chloe Smith on 24 March 2020. Smith confirmed in her written statement that primary legislation would be brought forward to remove the legal requirement to give effect to the recommendations of the Sixth Review and set the framework for future boundary reviews.

The main proposals in the statement were as follows:

Maintaining 650 seats
Under the legislation which governed the unimplemented 2018 Boundary Review recommendations, the number of constituencies was to be reduced from 650 to 600. It was proposed that this be retained at 650, on the grounds that Parliament will have a greater workload following the UK's departure from the European Union.
Electoral quota tolerance
It was proposed to maintain the current tolerance of ±5% from the average size of constituencies (the "electoral quota").
Protected constituencies
It was initially proposed that there would be no change to the four protected constituencies of Isle of Wight (divided into two seats), Na h-Eileanan an Iar (the Western Isles of Scotland) and Orkney and Shetland (the Northern Isles of Scotland), which are protected from the electoral quota due to their unique geography. However, during the passage of the legislation, an amendment was introduced to add Ynys Môn (the Isle of Anglesey in Wales), increasing the number of protected constituencies to five.
Boundary review cycle
It was proposed that reviews be carried out every eight years, rather than the current requirement of five years.
Implementation of recommendations
Currently, the final proposals of the Boundary Commissions are brought into effect through an Order in Council that must be approved by Parliament. It was proposed that the Order in Council be automatically passed in future.

Legislation

A bill was introduced on 19 May 2020 to reflect the written statement and it received its Second Reading on 2 June 2020. The Parliamentary Constituencies Act 2020 received royal assent on 14 December 2020. The Act amends the regulations underpinning the upcoming boundary review process, including the Parliamentary Constituencies Act 1986, Northern Ireland Act 1998, Boundary Commissions Act 1992 and Parliamentary Voting System and Constituencies Act 2011.

A summary of the main provisions of the Act is as follows:

Section 1 – Reports of the Boundary Commissions 

Each Boundary Commission must submit a report:
 before 1 July 2023,
 before 1 October 2031, and
 before 1 October of every eighth year after that.

Section 2 – Orders in Council giving effect to reports

This gives effect to the proposal that the Orders in Council be automatically passed. The Orders must be made within four months of the reports being laid before Parliament, "unless there are exceptional circumstances".

Section 3 – Modifications of recommendations in reports

A Boundary Commission may submit modifications to its report after it has been submitted but before an Order in Council has been drafted.

Section 4 – Publicity and consultation

This section changes the timings of various stages in the publicity and consultation procedures.

Section 5 – Number of parliamentary constituencies

The number of constituencies will remain at 650. Previously, the number was to be reduced to 600.

Section 6 – Taking account of local government boundaries

This amends the factors a Commission may take into account to include local government boundaries which are prospective on the "review date", as opposed to just being effective. Prospective local government boundaries are those which have been specified by legislation, but have not yet become effective.

Section 7 –  Protected constituencies

This adds Ynys Môn (defined as the area of the Isle of Anglesey County Council) as a protected constituency.

Section 8 – Registers used to determine the "electorate" in relation to the 2023 reports

For the 2023 reports, the date for determining the "electorate" to be used in the reviews is 2 March 2020 (rather than 1 December 2020). This amendment was specifically inserted partly because of the shorter time-frame for submitting the reports, but primarily because of concerns over collecting the data during the COVID-19 pandemic.

Section 9 – Alteration of the review date in relation to the 2023 reports

For the 2023 reports, the "review date" is specified as 1 December 2020, rather than 2 years and 10 months before the report date.

Section 10 – Removal of duty to implement etc. in relation to current reports

This section formally removes the duty to implement the previous reviews which were submitted in September 2018.

Commencement of reviews 
The four Boundary Commissions formally launched their 2023 reviews on 5 January 2021 to coincide with the release by the Office for National Statistics (ONS) of electorate data as published on 2 March 2020. The commissions jointly calculated the relevant electoral quota/range to be used for the 2023 review and the allocation of parliamentary constituencies between the four nations. The English commission further divided its allocation between the nine regions of England.

Size of constituencies 
The electorate of the United Kingdom, comprising 650 constituencies, as determined by the ONS, was 47,558,398 on 2 March 2020. The electorate of the five protected constituencies – Isle of Wight (two seats), Na h-Eileanan an Iar, Orkney and Shetland, and Ynys Môn – amounted to 220,132, leaving 47,338,266 to be distributed between the remaining 645 constituencies, which gives an electoral quota of 73,393. Each non-protected constituency must have an electorate which is within 5% of this quota, which gives a permitted range of 69,724 to 77,062. In Northern Ireland the legislation allows for a wider range, in certain prescribed circumstances, from 68,313 to 77,062.

Of the 646 unprotected constituencies (Isle of Wight currently has only one seat), 236 have electorates within the permitted range, while 203 are below and 207 are above.

The regional distribution of these seats is shown in the following table.

Distribution of seats

United Kingdom 
The 650 constituencies were allocated between the four nations of the UK in accordance with the method of allocation specified by the legislation as shown in the table below.

Regions of England 

The Commission for England has applied the same distribution formula to the English allocation, which results in the following redistribution of constituencies among the English regions:

* Excluding Isle of Wight

Comparison with the Fifth Review 
The current constituency boundaries are largely based on the Fifth Periodic Review of Westminster Constituencies which was carried out by the Boundary Commissions between 2000 and 2007. The Scottish review was completed in time for the 2005 general election, with the other three reviews coming into effect at the 2010 general election. In England, the fifth review was based on the number of electors on the electoral register published in February 2000. The electorates were therefore already 10 years out of date by the time it came into effect, and over 20 years have now passed.

The table below shows the movements in the national/regional electorates since those used for the fifth review.

Prospective wards 
The detailed constituency and ward electorates issued by the ONS are based on the local authority boundaries which are currently effective and do not take account of prospective changes which have been enacted on 1 December 2020. There are 31 such local authorities in England, of which 16 are London Boroughs. The Commission for England  subsequently worked with local authorities to produce updated data which includes these 'prospective' wards. A comprehensive list of ward electorates was published on 24 March 2021.

Timetable 
The initial outline timetable published by the Commission for England is as follows:

 January 2021: Begin development of initial proposals.
 10 May 2021: Publish Guide to the 2023 Review.
 8 June 2021: Publish initial proposals and conduct eight-week written consultation.
 Early 2022: Publish responses to initial proposals and conduct six-week 'secondary consultation', including between two and five public hearings in each region.
 Late 2022: Publish revised proposals and conduct four-week written consultation.
 June 2023: Submit and publish final report and recommendations.

Initial proposals

England 
The Boundary Commission for England published their initial proposals on 8 June 2021. The proposals represent significant changes to the existing boundaries, with just 47 existing constituencies remaining unchanged (just under 10% of existing constituencies). In addition, a further 69 constituencies were unchanged except to realign boundaries with new or prospective local government ward boundaries. Due to the constraints on the size of constituency electorates, it was not always possible to allocate whole numbers of constituencies to individual counties and to avoid crossing county boundaries. Accordingly, each region was divided into sub-regions which comprised a whole number of constituencies. 

The information in the table below is primarily extracted from the commission's summary sheets for each region.

Northern Ireland 
Initial proposals were published on 20 October 2021. As the number of constituencies in Northern Ireland remains the same, changes were only necessary to bring some of the electorates within the permitted range and align boundaries with those of revised local government wards. Major proposed changes are enlarging Strangford to include Lecale and renaming it 'Strangford and Quoile'. Belfast South would be enlarged into the countryside and renamed 'Belfast South and Mid Down'. East Antrim would be extended further west, while Fermanagh-South Tyrone would be extended further east into County Armagh.

Scotland 
The Boundary Commission for Scotland released its initial proposals on 14 October 2021.

The following table details the proposed changes, based on the commission's press release.

Wales 

Initial proposals for constituencies in Wales were published on 8 September 2021, reducing Wales' constituencies by 8, from 40 to 32.

Apart from the protected constituency of Ynys Môn, no constituencies are unchanged. The table below summarises the relationship between the remaining current constituencies and the initial proposals.

Notes:

1 The proposed constituency of Bridgend contains the majority of the current constituency of Ogmore and a minority of the current constituency of Bridgend (including the town of Bridgend). The current constituency is effectively abolished, with the majority being included in the proposed constituency of Aberafon Porthcawl.

2 The proposed constituency of Vale of Glamorgan contains the majority of the existing constituency, but no part of any other constituency.

Political impact 
According to analysis carried out in October 2021 by electoral modelling consultancy Electoral Calculus, a total of 28 constituencies would disappear (i.e. be broken up and not form the larger part of any proposed seats), offset by 28 wholly new constituencies (proposed seats which do not contain the larger part of any pre-existing seat). If the 2019 general election was re-run under the boundaries in the initial proposals, it is estimated that a further 23 seats would change hands. The overall effect would be a net gain of 13 seats for the Conservatives, a net loss of 8 for Labour, a loss of 3 for the Liberal Democrats and 2 for Plaid Cymru. This is further analysed as follows:

Consultation on initial proposals 
The publication of the initial proposals by each of the Boundary Commissions was followed by eight-week consultation periods. In total, over 36,000 comments were received. The Commissions subsequently published these comments on their respective web sites and further six-week secondary consultation periods were then held, giving the opportunity for observations to be made on the comments made in the initial consultations. In addition, a total of 45 public hearings were conducted.

Revised proposals

England 
The Commission for England published revised proposals on 8 November 2022, followed by a third and final, four-week, consultation period ending on 5 December. After receiving over 45,000 comments over the previous two consultation periods, the Commission revised nearly half the proposed constituencies put forward in its initial review (including name changes). Of the 225 constituencies whose boundaries were revised, 90 have revised names. A further 34 constituencies had changed names only. 55 of the 124 name changes revert to the current constituency names, either because the revised constituency boundaries are more closely aligned with the current boundaries, or because local residents objected to the new names put forward by the Commission. More extensive use of divided wards was included in the revised proposals, totalling 47, compared to 19 in the initial proposals. This enabled more communities to be kept together in one constituency and also meant that constituencies in some areas could more closely follow the existing configurations, resulting in fewer voters moving between seats.  

The information in the table below is primarily extracted from the commission's summary sheets for each region.

Northern Ireland 
The Commission for Northern Ireland published revised proposals for consultation on 14 November 2022. 

Minor amendments were made to eight of the 18 constituencies, making more use of divided wards to minimise the changes necessary to the current configuration of constituencies. As a result of the revisions, the proposed name of the Strangford and Quoile constituency will revert back to its current name of Strangford.

Scotland 
The Commission for Scotland also published revised proposals for consultation from 8 November to 5 December 2022.

Of the 55 mainland constituencies, 20 are unchanged from the initial proposals, including three with changed names only. Of the 35 revised constituencies, 20 also have revised names. There were no changes to the proposed groupings of council areas, but only the Ayrshire and East Renfrewshire groupings are completely unaffected.

Wales 
The Commission for Wales published revised proposals on 19 October 2022, with comments due no later than 15 November.

The Commission revised its initial proposals in terms of their geographical make-up in 22 of the 32 allocated constituencies, and 9 of the proposed constituency names were amended. Most of the adjustments resulted from moving electoral wards between neighbouring constituencies. The most significant change was combining western parts of Newport with the majority of the existing constituency of Islwyn, rather than parts of Caerphilly, on the basis of better local ties to form Newport West and Islwyn. The existing constituency of Caerphilly is retained with relatively minor changes composed wholly of wards from Caerphilly County Borough Council. There are also some boundary realignments in North Wales.

Political impact 
According to Electoral Calculus, the revised proposals result in four fewer new and abolished seats (24 v 28) and 7 fewer seats changing hands (16 v 23). Overall, compared to the initial proposals, this would result in three fewer seats won by the Conservative Party at the 2019 general election and three fewer lost by the Labour Party, resulting in a net gain of ten for the Conservatives and a net loss of five for Labour.  In an initial assessment, professors Colin Rallings and Michael Thrasher have estimated the Conservatives would have won five additional seats in 2019, with Labour unchanged.

References

External links
 Boundary Commission for England
 Boundary Commission for Scotland
 Boundary Commission for Wales
 Boundary Commission for Northern Ireland

2020 in British politics
2021 in British politics
Boundary commissions in the United Kingdom
Constituencies of the Parliament of the United Kingdom
Periodic Reviews of Westminster constituencies